Lee Wan Wah  (born 24 November 1975) is a former badminton player from Malaysia. He is currently the Japan's junior team coach.

Career overview 
Lee made his debut in Olympic Games in 2000 Sydney. Partnered with Choong Tan Fook, they advance to the semi finals stage, but lost to South Korean pair Lee Dong-soo and Yoo Yong-sung in the rubber game. The duo played in the bronze medal match against another South Korean Ha Tae-kwon and Kim Dong-moon, but lost in straight game with the score 2–15, 8–15.

In 2004 Athens, Lee and Choong had a bye in the first round and defeated Pramote Teerawiwatana and Tesana Panvisvas of Thailand in the second. In the quarterfinals, they lost to Lee Dong-soo & Yoo Yong-sung of South Korea 11–15, 15–11, 15–9.

In 2008, Lee participated in Jakarta for the Malaysian Thomas Cup team, being Choong's partner. In the semi-final, Lee did not play because Choong was sick. Consequently, Malaysia was beaten by the defending champion China.

At the Beijing Olympic Games, Lee and Choong, seeded four, surprisingly lost to South Korean Lee Jae-jin and Hwang Ji-man, who captured the bronze medal.

In November 2009, Lee and Choong Tan Fook reached Hong Kong Open Super Series semi-final but they lost to Denmark's Lars Paaske and Jonas Rasmussen.

Coaching 
In October 2008, Lee left Badminton Association of Malaysia (BAM) and established a company, Pioneer Sdn Bhd, with fellow badminton players Wong Choong Hann, Chan Chong Ming, and Chew Choon Eng, to coach young badminton players in Kota Damansara and Bandar Mahkota Cheras. They hoped that the company will turn into academies for local and international players.

In 2015, Lee Wan Wah started coaching professionals Koo Kien Keat and Tan Boon Heong. Koo and Tan went to look for Lee to be their coach since they Koo and Tan left the national set up. They are having a successful partnership under Lee and Koo and Tan are doing well in tournaments.

Achievements

World Championships 
Men's doubles

World Cup 
Men's doubles

Asian Championships

Southeast Asian Games 
Men's doubles

Commonwealth Games 
Men's doubles

BWF Super Series and BWF Grand Prix 
Men's doubles

  BWF Superseries tournament
 Grand Prix Gold Tournament
 Grand Prix Tournament
 IBF World Grand Prix tournament

Honour 
  :
  Member of the Order of the Defender of the Realm (A.M.N.) (2000)

References

External links 
 
 Pioneer Badminton Center official website

1975 births
Living people
People from Ipoh
Malaysian sportspeople of Chinese descent
Malaysian male badminton players
Badminton players at the 2000 Summer Olympics
Badminton players at the 2004 Summer Olympics
Badminton players at the 2008 Summer Olympics
Olympic badminton players of Malaysia
Badminton players at the 1998 Commonwealth Games
Commonwealth Games gold medallists for Malaysia
Commonwealth Games silver medallists for Malaysia
Commonwealth Games medallists in badminton
Competitors at the 1999 Southeast Asian Games
Competitors at the 2001 Southeast Asian Games
Competitors at the 2003 Southeast Asian Games
Competitors at the 2005 Southeast Asian Games
Southeast Asian Games gold medalists for Malaysia
Southeast Asian Games silver medalists for Malaysia
Southeast Asian Games bronze medalists for Malaysia
Southeast Asian Games medalists in badminton
World No. 1 badminton players
Badminton coaches
Members of the Order of the Defender of the Realm
Medallists at the 1998 Commonwealth Games